Ottilia is a feminine name and may refer to:

People (given name)
Ottilia Adelborg (1855–1936), Swedish children's book illustrator 
Ottilia Borbáth (born 1946), Romanian actress 
Ottilia Littmarck (1834–1929), Swedish actress and theatre director
Ottilia Reizman (1914–1986), Russian camerawoman and filmmaker
Saint Ottilia, previously Odile of Alsace (c. 662 – c. 720), Roman Catholic saint

Other
401 Ottilia, a large main-belt asteroid

See also
Ottilie